Cereus lamprospermus is a species of cactus in the subfamily Cactoideae, native to Bolivia and Paraguay. C.lamprospermus subsp. colosseus reaches , while C.lamprospermus subsp. lamprospermus "only" reaches .

Subtaxa
The following subspecies are accepted:
Cereus lamprospermus subsp. colosseus  – Bolivia
Cereus lamprospermus subsp. lamprospermus – Bolivia, Paraguay

References

lamprospermus
Flora of Bolivia
Flora of Paraguay
Plants described in 1899